The Horn is the most prominent peak on the Mount Buffalo plateau in Victoria, Australia. The Horn has an elevation of  AHD.

Found on the west side of the Victorian Alps (part of the Australian Alps and the Great Dividing Range), the top of the mountain has granite boulders and rock formations.

A walking track leads to the top of The Horn.

History
Aboriginal people made summer ascents to Mount Buffalo to gather and feast on the protein-rich Bogong Moth that cluster in rock crevices, and also to meet and hold ceremonies.
The Mount Buffalo plateau was named in 1824 by the explorers, Hume and Hovell, because of its supposed resemblance to a buffalo.

See also

Alpine National Park
List of mountains in Victoria

External links
 Mount Buffalo National Park

References

Mountains of Victoria (Australia)
Victorian Alps
Mountains of Hume (region)